This is a list of places in Luton, Bedfordshire, England.

Over the years Luton has expanded, taking in former neighbouring villages and hamlets, as well as by the construction of new estates and localities.

B
Barnfield
Biscot
Bramingham
Bury Park
Bushmead
Butterfield Green

C
Capability Green
Challney
Chapel Langley
Crawley Green

F
Farley Hill

H
Hart Hill
High Town
Hockwell Ring

L
Leagrave
Lewsey
Lewsey Farm
Lewsey Park
Limbury

M
Maidenhall
Marsh Farm

N
Napier Park
New Town

P
Putteridge
Putteridge Bury
Park Town

R
Ramridge End
Round Green
Runfold

S
Saints
Skimpot
South
Stopsley
Sundon Park

T
Tin Town
Tophill

V
Vauxhall Park

W
Warden Hill
Wigmore

Luton
Luton
 
Luton-related lists